The Philippine shortwing (Brachypteryx poliogyna) is a species of bird in the family Muscicapidae. It is endemic to the Philippines where it favours montane forest.

This species was formerly considered as subspecies of the white-browed shortwing, now the Javan shortwing (Brachypteryx montana). The white-browed shortwing was split into five separate species based on the deep genetic difference between the populations coupled with the significant differences in plumage and vocalization.

Seven subspecies are recognised:
 B. p. poliogyna Ogilvie-Grant, 1895 – montane north Luzon (north Philippines)
 B. p. andersoni Rand & Rabor, 1967 – montane south Luzon (north Philippines)
 B. p. mindorensis Hartert, EJO, 1916 – montane Mindoro (northwest Philippines)
 B. p. sillimani Ripley & Rabor, 1962 – montane Palawan (southwest Philippines)
 B. p. brunneiceps Ogilvie-Grant, 1896 – montane Negros and Panay (central west Philippines)
 B. p. malindangensis Mearns, 1909 – Mount Malindang (Zamboanga Peninsula, Mindanao, south Philippines)
 B. p. mindanensis Mearns, 1905 – Mount Apo, southeast Mindanao (south Philippines)

References

Philippine shortwing
Birds described in 1895